The Ter is a river in Catalonia, Spain,  that rises at an approximate elevation of  near the Ulldeter refuge at the foot of a glacial cirque delimited by the nearby peaks of el Bastiments, el Gra de Fajol, or el Pic de la Dona. It runs through the comarques of Ripollès, Osona, Selva, Gironès, and Baix Empordà, discharging into the Mediterranean Sea at l'Estartit.

Although its headwaters are in the Pyrenees, the Ter receives significant inflow from rivers in the middle and lower plains. Thus it is susceptible to flooding in both the spring and the autumn.

See also 
 List of rivers of Spain

Rivers of Spain
Rivers of Catalonia